Uncover is the third extended play (EP) by Swedish singer Zara Larsson. The EP was released on 16 January 2015 by TEN Music Group, Epic Records, and Sony Music. It is her first release internationally outside of Europe. The EP features six songs taken from her debut studio album, 1.

Critical reception
Kristen Maree of Renowned for Sound stated "Kicking off with laid-back, mid-tempo track 'Wanna Be Your Baby', Zara throws us back to some of Mariah Carey's peppier stuff, move quickly to 'Never Gonna Die' which you would be forgiven for mistaking for Rihanna. The title track 'Uncover' is the pretty ballad of the bunch, while 'Carry You Home' is exceptionally current and unique. The echoey 'She’s Not Me' is the closest we get to cliché, saved by Zara’s stunning vocal performance, while the closing 'Rooftop' is the nicest way to round off the EP, sounding like something from Taylor Swift's 1989." MuuMuse's Bradley Stern claimed "[Uncover] is the very essence of Swede–pop at its finest – strong songcraft, powerful melodies, and captivatingly pure vocals, from the feel–good, '80's synth–soaked 'Wanna Be Your Baby' to the thoroughly brilliant 'Rooftop' to 'She's Not Me, Pt. 1 & 2', which glides across ghostly wisps like one long, paranoid internal monologue and/or ode to Madonna's Hard Candy jam."

Track listing

Release history

References

2015 EPs
Pop music EPs
Zara Larsson albums